Arun Kumar is an Indian politician who represented Jahanabad constituency in Lok Sabha. He won the seat in the 2014 Indian general election and 1999, and he is a founding member of the Rashtriya Samata Party (Secular). He is the founder and head of Gyan Bharti Model Residential Complex school in Hisua, Nawada. He often visits the school during Annual Day functions as chief guest. He was a close friend of dreaded don turned politician of Bihar ex MP Anand Mohan Singh of Saharsa. He founded Bharatiya Sab Log Party in 2020.

Bhartiya Sab Log Party 
Bhartiya Sab Log Party (abbr. BSLP) was founded by Arun Kumar and Yashwant Sinha before 2020 Bihar Legislative Assembly elections. BSLP fought on 30 seats in 2020 Bihar Elections but couldn't manage to win any one of them. In January 2022, BSLP merged with Lok Janshakti Party (Ram Vilas). BSLP inaugurated a Film city on name of Late Actor Sushant Singh Rajput.

References

Living people
India MPs 2014–2019
Lok Sabha members from Bihar
People from Jehanabad district
Rashtriya Lok Samata politicians
1959 births
Samata Party politicians